Waiting III is a bronze sculpture by French artist Val. The piece can be seen at New Times Square in Taipei where it has been on public display since 2014.

Description 
The enlargement of this piece was a matter of new thinking at every step of the process in order to finally achieve the balance at a larger-scale. The work depicts an attitude, rather than the representation of humanity in its generality or than a portrait.

"The man is waiting there in silence. What does he expect? Will his expectation be fulfilled? Query on his fate. Phases of doubt and daring, hopeful interiority."

References 

Bronze sculptures
Buildings and structures in Taipei